The Changhe A6 is a compact sedan produced by BAIC under the Changhe subsidiary.

Overview

The Changhe A6 compact sedan shares the same platform with the second generation Senova D50, and the engine is also the Mitsubishi-sourced 1.5 liter producing 116 hp and 142 Nm of torque used by Senova D50. Prices of the Changhe A6 ranges from 69,800 to 99,800 yuan.

References

External links 

 BAIC Official site

Changhe vehicles
Cars introduced in 2017
Compact cars
Front-wheel-drive vehicles
Sedans
Vehicles with CVT transmission
Cars of China